Abis Hasan Rizvi (27 February 1968 – 1 January 2017) was an Indian businessman, film producer, and screenwriter.

Life

Early life 
Rizvi was born to Dr. Akhtar Hassan Rizvi, a former member of the Rajya Sabha in Bandra, West Mumbai, Maharashtra. Rizvi lived in Mumbai with his wife and son. Rizvi was director of the Rizvi Group and CEO of his father's real estate company Rizvi Builders. His uncle Sibte Hassan Rizvi directed the films Khamoshi (1986) and Joshilay (1989). His cousin Anjum Rizvi is the producer of Ahista Ahista (2006) and A Wednesday (2008).

Film career 
Rizvi was producer and co-writer of the Indian feature films Roar: Tigers of the Sundarbans (2014) and bilingual Hindi-Punjabi docu-drama He-Man (2016). He worked last on the drama film T for Taj Mahal. He was founder of film company ARF Films (Abis Rizvi Films), the company behind the latter two films.

Death 
While on holiday in Turkey with friends, Rizvi was one of the victims of the terrorist attack in the Reina  nightclub in Istanbul on 1 January 2017 in which 39 people were killed.

Filmography

Movies Produced

References

External links
 Official Site
 

1968 births
2017 deaths
20th-century Indian businesspeople
21st-century Indian businesspeople
Deaths by firearm in Turkey
Film producers from Mumbai
Hindi film producers
Indian chief executives
Indian male screenwriters
Indian people murdered abroad
Indian real estate businesspeople
People from Bandra
Terrorism deaths in Turkey